Nereide was the name of at least two ships of the Italian Navy and may refer to:

 , a  launched in 1913 and sunk in 1915.
 , a  launched in 1933 and sunk in 1943.

Italian Navy ship names